The Samurai Museum Berlin is a private museum of artifacts and art objects of the Japanese samurai warrior class, from the private collection of the builder Peter Janssen. It opened in 2022 and is located in the Mitte district of Berlin, Germany.

The museum displays about 1000 exhibits on 1500 square meters of exhibition space. The entire collection of the museum includes nearly 4000 objects. Among them are about 40 complete suits of armor, 200 helmets, 150 masks, 160 swords, and numerous other evidences of samurai culture dating back nearly a millennium.

The oldest pieces in the collection date back to the Kofun period (300-538 AD). The majority of the objects date from the late Middle Ages and the early modern period (15th-18th centuries). Top pieces of the collection represent three samurai armors of the Kato clan from the Edo period (1603-1868). Another focus is on blades of famous master smiths of the Kamakura and Namboku-chō periods, which roughly corresponds to the European High Middle Ages (11th-14th centuries).

In addition to armor, helmets, masks, weapons, swords, and sword jewelry, the permanent exhibition also offers insights into wide-ranging areas of samurai culture, society, religion, and craftsmanship. These also include sculpture and painting, a lifelike Nō theater and Nō masks, and a freestanding teahouse with utensils used in the Japanese tea ceremony.

Through interactive installations and touchscreens attached to the exhibits, the exhibits are described in detail in either German or English. In parallel, a quiz available on the touch screens allows visitors to test or expand their own knowledge of samurai culture. The technology behind the interactive installations was designed by Ars Electronica.

In addition to the permanent exhibition, temporary exhibitions are also held.

Literature 

 Claudia Fährenkemper: Samurai, 2019

 Barbara Harding: The "Arts of Asia" Conversation with Peter Janssen of the Samurai Art Museum. In: Arts of Asia, July/August 2019: pp. 22-32.

 Eckhard Kremers: The Samurai Art Museum in Berlin. Interview with collector Peter Janssen. (Photographs by Manfred-Michael Sackmann) In: Ostasiatische Zeitschrift. New Series No. 35, Spring 2018.

 Martyna Lesniewska: Samurai Art Museum. The Janssen Collection. In: Museums Journal 2/2018: p. 33 ff.

References

External links 
 

Berlin
Samurai
Museums in Berlin